Juan Coronel (1569 in Spain – 1651 at Mérida, Mexico) was a Spanish Franciscan missionary.

Life

He made his academic studies at the University of Alcalá de Henares, and joined the Franciscans of the province of Castile. He was sent to Yucatán, Mexico, in 1590, and there so familiarized himself with the Maya language that he was able to teach it, the historian Diego López de Cogolludo being one of his pupils.

Father Coronel was one of the foremost Christian teachers in Yucatán in the seventeenth century. He was a strict Observantine for sixty-seven years, always travelling barefooted. His austerity impeded his election to the office of Provincial of the Franciscan Order in Yucatán.

Works

Cogolludo says he wrote a Maya grammar (Arte) that was printed in Mexico, of which, however, nothing else is known. A catechism in Maya: "Doctrina cristiana en lengua Maya", was published at Mexico in 1620, and in the same year there appeared in print, also at Mexico, "Discursos predicables y tratados espirituales en lengua Maya". Both are exceedingly rare.

References

Attribution
 The entry cites:
Diego López de Cogolludo, Historia de Yucatán (Madrid, 1688; Mérida, 1842); 
Beristain, Biblioteca hispano-americana (Mexico, 1816; Amecameca, 1883); 
Ephraim George Squier, Monograph of Authors who have Written on the Languages of Central America (New York, 1861); he merely copies Beristain.

1569 births
1651 deaths
Spanish Franciscans
Spanish Roman Catholic missionaries
University of Alcalá alumni
Roman Catholic missionaries in New Spain
Franciscan missionaries